The Windrose 18 is an American trailerable sailboat that was designed by W. Shad Turner as a cruiser and first built in 1974.

The Windrose 18 design was developed into the Windrose 5.5 in 1977.

Production
The design was built by Laguna Yachts in the United States, starting in 1974, but it is now out of production.

Design
The Windrose 18 is a recreational keelboat, built predominantly of fiberglass. It has a fractional sloop rig, a raked stem, a plumb transom, a transom-hung rudder controlled by a tiller and a retractable swing keel. It displaces  and carries  of ballast.

The boat is normally fitted with a small  outboard motor for docking and maneuvering.

The design has sleeping accommodation for four people, with a double "V"-berth in the bow cabin and two straight settee berths in the main cabin. The optional galley is located on the starboard side and slides under the cockpit when not in use. The head is located in the bow cabin under the "V"-berth.

For sailing the design is equipped with a range of jibs and genoas.

In his 2010 book, The Sailor's Book of Small Cruising Sailboats, author Steve Henkel praised the Windrose 18 as "a showpiece" of Shad Turner's California sailboat design aesthetic, that emphasized "avante garde" modernist styling.

See also
List of sailing boat types

Related development
Windrose 5.5

References

External links
Photo of a Windrose 18
Windrose 18 rigging and sailing video

Keelboats
1970s sailboat type designs
Sailing yachts
Trailer sailers
Sailboat type designs by W. Shad Turner
Sailboat types built by Laguna Yachts